Brian Malone (born 2 May 1986) is the current captain of the Wexford senior football team. He made his debut against Monaghan in the 2006 All-Ireland qualifiers. Malone has also represented Wexford in senior hurling. He won a Leinster and all-Ireland intermediate hurling medal in 2007.

Brian Malone has previously taught at Blackrock College and currently teaches at St. Peters, Wexford. He trained as a teacher at Mater Dei Institute of Education, Dublin. Malone holds the record for most senior appearances for Wexford with 166 in total to date.

References

External links
 https://web.archive.org/web/20120929044433/http://www.gaainfo.com/players/football/wexford/Brian%20Malone.php
 http://www.sportsfile.com/id/521245/
 https://web.archive.org/web/20100615002441/http://www.rte.ie/sport/gaa/championship/2010/0613/dublin_wexford.html

External links
 brianmalone.com

1985 births
Living people
Alumni of Mater Dei Institute of Education
Wexford inter-county Gaelic footballers
Wexford inter-county hurlers
Shelmaliers hurlers